The Ministry of Public Works and Transport (MOPT) is an agency of the government of Costa Rica in charge of roads, airports and maritime ports planning and construction, it also regulates public transportation.

History 

On May 8, 1948 after the civil war, the transitional government created the agency as the Ministry of Public Works, then on August 5, 1963 it is renamed as Ministry of Transport, and on July 5, 1971 gets its final name as Ministry of Public Works and Transport.

References

Public Works and Transport
Costa Rica